Abeel Island is an island on the Mohawk River north of Fort Plain in Montgomery County, New York.

References

Islands of New York (state)
Mohawk River
River islands of New York (state)